Ragazze da marito is a 1952 Italian comedy film.

Cast
 Eduardo De Filippo as Oreste Mazzillo
 Peppino De Filippo as Giacomo Scognamiglio
 Titina De Filippo as  Agnese Mazzillo
 Lianella Carell as Gina Mazzillo
 Anna Maria Ferrero as Anna Maria Mazzillo
 Delia Scala as Gabriella Mazzillo
 Carlo Campanini as Cipriano
 Carlo Croccolo as the hawker
 Rosario Borelli as Carlo
 Laura Gore as Rosa 
 Monica Clay as Kiki
 Franco Fabrizi as Claudio Fortis
 Pamela Matthews as Mirca 
 Lyla Rocco as Doris 
 Olinto Cristina as Commendator Spadoni
 Ivo Garrani as Tommaso Spadoni

References

External links
 

1952 films
1950s Italian-language films
Films set in Rome
Films set in Campania
Films directed by Eduardo De Filippo
Films scored by Nino Rota
Italian comedy films
1952 comedy films
Italian black-and-white films
1950s Italian films